Clemmensen reduction is a chemical reaction described as a reduction of ketones (or aldehydes) to alkanes using zinc amalgam and concentrated hydrochloric acid. This reaction is named after Erik Christian Clemmensen, a Danish chemist.

The original Clemmensen reduction conditions are particularly effective at reducing aryl-alkyl ketones, such as those formed in a Friedel-Crafts acylation.  The two-step sequence of Friedel-Crafts acylation followed by Clemmensen reduction constitutes a classical strategy for the primary alkylation of arenes.  With aliphatic or cyclic ketones, modified Clemmensen conditions using activated zinc dust in an anhydrous solution of hydrogen chloride in diethyl ether or acetic anhydride is much more effective.

The substrate must be tolerant of the strongly acidic conditions of the Clemmensen reduction (37% HCl).  Several alternatives are available.  Acid-sensitive substrates that are stable to strong base can be reduced using the Wolff-Kishner reduction; a further, milder method for substrates stable to hydrogenolysis in the presence of Raney nickel is the two-step Mozingo reduction.

In spite of the antiquity of this reaction, the mechanism of the Clemmensen reduction remains obscure.  Due to the heterogeneous nature of the reaction, mechanistic studies are difficult, and only a handful of studies have been disclosed. Mechanistic proposals generally invoke organozinc intermediates, sometimes including zinc carbenoids, either as discrete species or as organic fragments bound to the zinc metal surface.  However, the corresponding alcohol is believed not to be an intermediate, since subjection of the alcohol to Clemmensen conditions generally does not afford the alkane product.

Further reading

See also
Haworth phenanthrene synthesis
Mozingo reduction
Wolff-Kishner reduction

References

Name reactions
Organic reduction reactions
Organic redox reactions